Corinne Debaine-Francfort is a French archaeologist and sinologist, a resreacher at the CNRS specialised in the archaeology on Eastern Central Asia (Sinkiang or East Turkestan) and in the protohistory of north-west China.

Career 
Debaine-Francfort has been a Doctor of Far Eastern studies at Paris Diderot University (Paris 7) since 1989 and research director at CNRS since 1995. She is a member of a team carrying out research on Central Asia. She has taken part in various archaeological expeditions in this region, and in the first Sino-foreign excavation to be authorized by China since 1949. Since 1995 she has been co-director of the Franco-Chinese archaeological mission to Sinkiang.

Awards and honours 
 1997: Prix Clio pour la Recherche archéologique française à l'étranger
 2004: Prix Hirayama de l'Académie des Inscriptions et Belles-Lettres
 2013: Prix La Recherche, mention 'Archéologie', pour le programme « Bio-archéologie » de la Mission archéologique franco-chinoise au Sinkiang
 2014: Grand Prix d'archéologie de la Fondation Simone et Cino del Duca
 2015: Chevalier dans l'Ordre national du Mérite

(lit. 'The Rediscovery of Ancient China'; English-language edition: The Search for Ancient China) is a pocket-sized book on archaeology of China published by Éditions Gallimard in 1998 in the  series of their  collection. Debaine-Francfort starts this archaeological journey with the "Birth of Archaeology in China" (chap. I), followed by chapters devoted to the artefacts and other findings of the Neolithic Age (chap. II, "The Chinese Neolithic: From Singular to Plural"), Shang dynasty (chap. III, "The Shang: The Emergence of a Civilization"), Zhou dynasty (chap. IV, "Eight Centuries of Eventful History"), Qin dynasty (chap. V, "Qin or the First Empire") and Han dynasty (chap. VI, "The Spread of the Han Empire"). The "Documents" section at the back contains a compilation of excerpts which is divided into four parts: 1, The time of the collectors; 2, The first emperor; 3, Text and memory; 4, A conversation with K. C. Chang. In addition to the excerpts, it also features in this section a chronology, a table of historical landmarks, a list of further reading, list of illustrations and an index. The book has been translated into American and British English, Italian, Japanese, Russian, South Korean, Swedish and Turkish.

At the beginning of the 20th century, China opened its doors to the rest of the world: the clash of cultures, the encounter of East and West. Despite this epoch of political chaos, important discoveries were made and scientific bodies for research were established due to the introduction of new field methods made by western archaeologists. After the communists took control of China, from 1949 until 1973, Chinese archaeology went through a period of darkness and retreat. Today the splendours and achievements of ancient China are revealed to modern eyes: a large number of discoveries, major international exhibitions follow one another. From the early Neolithic painted pottery, the Shang and Zhou bronzes, the bronze bells of Marquis Yi of Zeng, the impressive army of the First Emperor, to the lavish tomb of the Marquise of Dai; from the Yellow River to the Blue River, from North to South, China's origins are revealed.

Selected publications 
 Du Néolithique à l'Âge du Bronze en Chine du Nord-Ouest : La culture de Qijia et ses connexions, collection « Mémoires de la Mission Archéologique Française en Asie Centrale » (nº 6). Paris: Éditions Recherche sur les Civilisations, 1995
 La redécouverte de la Chine ancienne, collection « Découvertes Gallimard » (nº 360), série Archéologie. Paris: Éditions Gallimard, 1998 (new edition in 2008)
 UK edition – The Search for Ancient China, 'New Horizons' series. London: Thames & Hudson, 1999 (reprinted in 2010)
 US edition – The Search for Ancient China, "Abrams Discoveries" series. New York: Harry N. Abrams, 1999
 With Abduressul Idriss, Keriya, mémoires d'un fleuve : Archéologie et civilisation des oasis du Taklamakan, Paris: Éditions Findakly, 2001

Documentaries 
The Mummies of Taklamakan, a 2003 documentary film about the Taklamakan mummies discovered by the research campaign led by Corinne Debaine-Francfort and Abduressul Idriss. It is a part of the DVD documentary  from Arte's documentary collection The Human Adventure. The documentary is directed by Olivier Horn and available in English.

See also 
 Jean-Pierre Drège

References 

French archaeologists
French sinologists
20th-century French women writers
21st-century French women writers
French National Centre for Scientific Research scientists
Knights of the Ordre national du Mérite
Living people
Year of birth missing (living people)
French women archaeologists